The Morton H. Meyerson Symphony Center is a concert hall located in the Arts District of downtown Dallas, Texas (USA). Ranked one of the world's greatest orchestra halls, it was designed by architect I.M. Pei and acoustician Russell Johnson's Artec Consultants, Inc. The structural engineers for this project was Leslie E. Robertson Associates, and opened in September 1989.

The center is named for Morton Meyerson, former president of Electronic Data Systems and former chairman and CEO of Perot Systems, who led the 10-year effort by the Dallas Symphony Association to create a home for the Dallas Symphony Orchestra. The new concert center was named in his honor in 1986 at the request of H. Ross Perot, who made a $10 million contribution to the building fund for the naming rights. It is the permanent home of the Dallas Symphony Orchestra and the Dallas Symphony Chorus, as well as the primary performing venue of the Dallas Wind Symphony as well as several other Dallas-based musical organizations. The Meyerson Symphony Center is owned by the City of Dallas and operated by the Dallas Symphony Association.

There are four private suites, for small concerts, meetings and events designed by Booziotis & Company Architects of Dallas - Texas.

Design 
The exterior of the large pavilion and lobby is circular and constructed of glass and metal supports to contrast with the solid geometric lines of the actual hall. Architect I. M. Pei, and structural engineer Leslie E. Robertson Associates has described the structure of the hall's interior as "very conservative". "It is conservative for reasons I no longer accept," he said in 2000. "I feel that the hall doesn't fully represent what I would have liked to do. It was my first one." Because the music performed in the hall was likely to be from the eighteenth and nineteenth centuries, Pei was unwilling to impose modern styles of architecture on the interior.

The trustees and acoustic team had decided on the shoebox style before Pei was hired, and he sought to sculpt the exteriors with more innovative designs. "I felt the need to be free," he said. "Therefore, to wrap another form around the shoebox, I started to use curvilinear forms.... It does have some spatial excitement in that space for that reason."

Organ
The Meyerson Symphony Center also is home to the 4,535 pipe C.B. Fisk Opus 100 organ, known as the Lay Family Concert Organ. Although it had been Charles Fisk's dream to build a monumental concert organ (the firm unsuccessfully bid on the contract for San Francisco's Davies Hall), and despite years of planning and design, he never lived to see it built, dying in 1983. The resulting instrument, built in 1991 and nearly unanimously hailed as a musical triumph, whilst it built on some of his ideas, was quite different from his original designs. The première performance was given in September 1992 by organists Michael Murray and David Higgs.

Acoustics 
The Eugene McDermott Concert Hall was designed by Artec Consultants (also responsible for the Pikes Peak Center's El Pomar Great Hall). Artec's Nicholas Edwards built upon ideas of Russell Johnson, the firm's founder, combining them with his own research and those of the German group in Göttingen. Systematically working through each area of the hall on each level, he generated sketches that indicated the best placement for walls in order to optimize the all-important lateral reflections. As his ideas crystallized, he began calling the evolving room shape the ‘reverse fan.’ This was the eventual shape of both the Dallas concert hall and its younger sibling, Symphony Hall in Birmingham, England. Both these halls have strong ‘shoebox’ shaping, with the ‘reverse fan’ at the back of the room. 74 thick concrete chamber doors around the top of the hall weighing 2.5 tons each can be opened and closed to increase or reduce reverberance, 56 acoustical curtains help diminish sound vibrations and a system of canopies weighing more than 42 tons is suspended above the stage and can be raised, lowered, or tilted to reflect the sound throughout the audience chamber.  The shoebox design was intended to achieve acoustical performance comparable to that of the Vienna Musikverein and the Amsterdam Concertgebouw.
Russell Johnson, who died in August 2007, requested in his will that he be buried in the Meyerson, but logistical complications prevented the request from being granted.

Statistics 
The Morton H. Meyerson Symphony Center has:
 above ground space
 below ground space
 of concrete
 of Italian travertine marble
22,000 pieces of Indiana limestone
4,535 organ pipes
2,062 seats
918 square panels of African (Makore) cherrywood
216 square panels of American cherrywood
211 glass panels (no two alike) comprising the conoid windows
 high ceiling in the concert hall
74 concrete reverberation chamber doors, each weighing as much as 2.5 tons
56 acoustical curtains
50 restrooms
4 private suites for meetings, banquets, and recitals

See also 
 List of concert halls
 List of buildings and structures in Dallas, Texas

Notes

References
 von Boehm, Gero. Conversations with I.M. Pei: Light is the Key. Munich: Prestel, 2000. .

External links

 Meyerson Symphony Center's Official Web Site
 City of Dallas Office of Cultural Affairs
 Dallas Symphony Orchestra's Official Web Site
 Official Web Site of the Dallas Symphony Chorus
 Pei Cobb Freed & Partners Architect and Design firm's official website for the Meyerson Symphony Center
 Nicholas Edwards, principal acoustics designer for the concert hall
 Meyerson Symphony Center's C.B. Fisk Organ
 QTVR Tour of the Meyerson Symphony Center
 NY Times 1989 Review

Concert halls in Dallas
Downtown Dallas
I. M. Pei buildings
Landmarks in Dallas
Music venues in Dallas
Performing arts centers in Texas
Texas classical music